Filipe Manuel Carvalho Paiva (born 10 May 1991) is a Portuguese footballer who plays for C.F. Os Belenenses, as a central defender.

External links 
 

1991 births
Living people
People from Alcochete
Association football central defenders
Portuguese footballers
C.F. Os Belenenses players
Primeira Liga players
Sportspeople from Setúbal District